Stephen A. Jarislowsky,  (born September 9, 1925) is a Canadian business magnate, investor, and philanthropist. He is the founder, chairman and CEO of Jarislowsky Fraser Limited, a Canadian investment management firm with over Can$40 billion in assets under management.

His personal wealth was estimated at $1.42 billion in December 2017, making him the 34th richest person in Canada.

Biography
Jarislowsky was born in Berlin, Germany, the son of Kaethe (née Gassmann) and Alfred Jarislowsky.

In 2007, Jarislowsky's firm, which owns 18 percent of the shares of Canfor, was embroiled in a bitter proxy fight with Vancouver-based tycoon Jim Pattison, who owns 25 percent of the company. Pattison won and ousted CEO Jim Shepherd over Canfor's poor performance and declining share price, replacing him for the interim with Jim Shepard.

In several magazine and newspaper articles between 2002 and 2004, Jarislowsky predicted a deep economic recession, which began in 2008 in the United States and spread around the world. On December 16, 2008, in an interview on CBC's The Current, he opined that the current recession would last at least two to five years and may last much longer if corrective measures are not taken by governments and the general public. He further argued that inflation is the only solution in the circumstances to reducing the enormous debt loads held at all levels of society and that massive and immediate government spending is also needed to stimulate the economy.

Personal life
He is married and has four children. Jarislowsky is a Companion of the Order of Canada and a Grand Officer (promoted from Knight) of the National Order of Quebec.

Criticism and advocacy

Business ethics
Apart from his personal business pursuits, he is a defender of business ethics (and a critic of ethical breaches). In 2002 he co-founded (with Claude Lamoureux) the Canadian Coalition for Good Governance to promote strong business ethics.

Quebec separatism
Jarislowsky is openly against Quebec nationalism. In a 1997 speech to the Westmount Municipal Association, Jarislowsky drew comparisons between Parizeau and Bouchard with the fascism of Franco's Spain and Hitler's Nazi Germany and told how, days after the 1995 referendum, he suggested the partition of Quebec and the transformation of Montreal into a City state. In his speech, he stated that his fellow citizens should oppose the PQ which he said, "feed on the same kind of quasi religious fervor on which all fascists feed (be it the Soviet Union, Nazi Germany of fascist Italy, etc.) A Parizeau, a Bouchard should never be underestimated and, despite lullabies, should never put one to sleep."

Boards and charities
He was a Director of the C.D. Howe Institute and has also been active in numerous other corporations besides his own including SNC-Lavalin, Canfor, Southam, Swiss Bank, and Abitibi. He has participated in educational, cultural and charitable activities, and with his wife Gail, to date has endowed numerous eponymous university chairs in Canada.

Publications
 The Investment Zoo (co-written with Craig Toomey), .

References

External links
 Biography

1925 births
Living people
Businesspeople from Montreal
Canadian billionaires
Canadian philanthropists
Companions of the Order of Canada
Cornell University College of Engineering alumni
German emigrants to Canada
Grand Officers of the National Order of Quebec
Harvard Business School alumni
Businesspeople from Berlin
University of Chicago alumni
Asheville School alumni
United States Army personnel of World War II